Joseph L. Williams (November 9, 1958 – July 26, 2015) was the film critic for the daily St. Louis Post-Dispatch (#29 among U.S. newspapers) and the Web site STLtoday.com in St. Louis, Missouri. He was also the author of the books Entertainment on the Net, Hollywood Myths and The Grassy Knoll Report.
Williams had been a staff writer for the newspaper since 1996. From 2003 to 2006, he was the on-camera movie reviewer for St. Louis TV station KMOV. He was a frequent guest on radio and television broadcasts in the region.

Biography
Williams was born on November 9, 1958.  He attended public schools in St. Louis County, graduating in 1976 from Parkway West High School.  He was a 1982 graduate of the University of Southern California, where his mentor was the novelist T.C. Boyle. He received a bachelor's degree in English from the school.  Williams received his master's degree from the Missouri School of Journalism at the University of Missouri in 1987.

From 1988 to 1990, Williams was a staff writer for the music industry trade magazine Cashbox in Los Angeles, California. He is credited with being the first national critic to write about the band The Posies, who were signed to Geffen Records after Williams' review of the album Failure.

In 2012 Williams completed his second book, Hollywood Myths (Voyageur Press), an anthology of movie legends and lore.

In 2013, Williams published The Grassy Knoll Report, culminating his 30 years of research into the assassination of President John F. Kennedy.

Williams' reviews, columns and interviews with celebrities are syndicated to newspapers across the U.S. His reviews are excerpted on the popular Web sites Rotten Tomatoes, where he is listed as a "Top Critic," and Metacritic. Williams served as a juror, panelist and adjunct host for the annual St. Louis International Film Festival. On November 22, 2013, Williams and the festival hosted director Oliver Stone for a 50th anniversary discussion of the Kennedy assassination.

Williams was killed in a single-car accident on July 26, 2015 in Jefferson County, Missouri. He was traveling southbound on Highway 67, when he veered too far to the left, over-corrected and drove into a ditch on the right side of the highway. He was 56 years old.

References

External links
 Joe's Movie Lounge (blog and current movie reviews)
 Reel Time, Joe Williams' movie-discussion forum
 Archive of Joe Williams' film reviews at the St. Louis Post-Dispatch
 The Top Movies of 2009 (interview with Joe Williams on National Public Radio station KWMU)

1958 births
2015 deaths
American film critics
Road incident deaths in Missouri
St. Louis Post-Dispatch people
University of Missouri alumni
University of Southern California alumni